Darwell Reservoir lies to the west of Mountfield, East Sussex, England.  The reservoir provides water for Southern Water customers.
The reservoir covers around 156 acres (63.4 hectares) and is just over a mile long. Work began on its construction in about 1937 and it was completed in 1949, when it was officially opened by the Duke of Norfolk. When it was filled, 9 cottages, including Birchford Cottages, Darwell Furnace Farm and cottages associated with it, were lost under the water. A pipeway was laid in the 1980s takes water to Beauport Park to supply Hastings.

The Darwell Reservoir is surrounded by ancient woodland, including the Darwell Wood a Site of Special Scientific Interest (SSSI). Which is a broadleaved woodland of 92.9 acres (37.6 hectares), which is dissected by streams draining into the reservoir from the north.

Cranbrook and District Angling Club has the sole fishing rights at the reservoir.

References

External links
Fishing Darwell Reservoir
Darwell water level (Southern Water)

Drinking water reservoirs in England
Reservoirs in East Sussex